is a Japanese professional golfer and former member of the LPGA Tour.

Amateur career 
Higashio was born in Fukuoka Prefecture, Japan. As a teenager, she won the 1993 Japan Amateur Championship and the 1994 Japan Junior Championship.

Higashio first attended Nihon University in Tokyo. She accepted an athletic scholarship to attend the University of Florida in Gainesville, Florida, United States, where she played for the Florida Gators women's golf team in National Collegiate Athletic Association (NCAA) competition from 1996 to 1998. Higashio won four tournaments as a college golfer. She was recognized as the Southeastern Conference (SEC) Freshman of the Year in 1996, and was a first-team All-SEC selection in 1996, 1997 and 1998, an honorable mention All-American in 1996, and a first-team All-American in 1998. She was also honored as a member of the National Golf Coaches Association All-American Scholar Team and graduated from the University of Florida with a bachelor's degree in psychology in 1998. Higashio will be inducted into the University of Florida Athletic Hall of Fame as a "Gator Great" in 2013.

Professional career 
Higashio turned professional in 1998. She joined the LPGA of Japan Tour and the Futures Tour in 1999, and that year she won the SNET Women's Classic on the Futures Tour. Higashio officially joined the LPGA Tour in 2004, and placed thirteenth overall at the Sybase Classic later that year. She placed tenth in the MasterCard Classic in 2005. Higashio suffered a shoulder injury leading to surgery in 2006, and last played on the LPGA Tour in 2007.  Her career earnings as a professional golfer totaled over $180,000.

Family 
Higashio is the daughter of Osamu Higashio, a member of the Japanese Baseball Hall of Fame and a former pitcher and manager of the Seibu Lions baseball team. She is married to Japanese actor Junichi Ishida.

Futures Tour wins 
1999 SNET Women's Classic

Team appearances
Amateur
Espirito Santo Trophy (representing Japan): 1994

Professional
Lexus Cup (representing Asia team): 2005

See also 

 List of Florida Gators women's golfers on the LPGA Tour
 List of University of Florida alumni
 List of University of Florida Athletic Hall of Fame members

References

External links 

Higashio's Official Fan Site

Japanese female golfers
Florida Gators women's golfers
LPGA of Japan Tour golfers
LPGA Tour golfers
Nihon University alumni
Sportspeople from Fukuoka Prefecture
People from Alachua County, Florida
1975 births
Living people